Adrian Bubb is an Australian former professional rugby league footballer who played in the 1980s. He played for the Newcastle Knights in 1988.

External links
http://www.rugbyleagueproject.org/players/Adrian_Bubb/summary.html

Living people
Australian rugby league players
Newcastle Knights players
Year of birth missing (living people)
Place of birth missing (living people)
Rugby articles needing expert attention